Pearl in the Crown is a 1972 Polish drama film directed by Kazimierz Kutz. It was entered into the 1972 Cannes Film Festival. The film was also selected as the Polish entry for the Best Foreign Language Film at the 45th Academy Awards, but was not accepted as a nominee.

Plot
The film takes place in August 1934 in the Polish part of Upper Silesia. The film tells the story of a strike in the fictional mine "Zygmunt". Jaś, a young miner who works in the mine in question, has a wife and two young sons. Jaś comes home from shift. The next day he learns that the unprofitable mine is to be closed by flooding with water. A strike breaks out. Families help the strikers, despite the fact that the mine is surrounded by a police cordon. Petitions to the Government remain unanswered, the management persists, so the miners announce a hunger strike. The police retaliate by violently breaking up the demonstration. The determined miners decide to continue the strike underground despite the imminent threat of the mine being flooded, as per the original plan.  Finally though, the management signs a settlement, and the miners come to the surface and they go back to their families.

Cast
 Łucja Kowolik - Wikta
 Olgierd Łukaszewicz - Jas
 Jan Englert - Erwin Maliniok
 Franciszek Pieczka - Hubert Siersza
 Jerzy Cnota - August Mol
 Bernard Krawczyk - Franciszek Bula
 Tadeusz Madeja - Ochman
 Henryk Maruszczyk - Alojz Grudniok
 Marian Opania - Albert
 Jerzy Siwy - Milenda

See also
 List of submissions to the 45th Academy Awards for Best Foreign Language Film
 List of Polish submissions for the Academy Award for Best Foreign Language Film

References

External links

1972 films
Polish drama films
1970s Polish-language films
1972 drama films
Films directed by Kazimierz Kutz
Films scored by Wojciech Kilar
Upper Silesia